Eudlo railway station is located on the North Coast line in Queensland, Australia. It serves the town of Eudlo in the Sunshine Coast Region. It is one of few stations that can only fit 4 carriages onto the platform.

History

Eudlo railway station opened in 1891 as part of the section of the North Coast railway line from Landsborough to Yandina.

In 1908, two goods trains collided in Yandina due to a signalling error.

In 1911, a railway worker riding a railway tricycle was struck by a train. Although the tricycle was described as "smashed to atoms", the worker was not seriously injured. In 1912, two trains collided, derailing one of them.

In 1924, a number of carriages were derailed from a goods train.

In 1931, a wagon carrying petrol was derailed. In 1933, there was a head-on collision of the Townsville Express (a passenger train) and a goods train, derailing the parlour car and the sleeping cars of the passenger train.

On 2 September 1939, a passenger train was waiting at the Eudlo station for a freight train to pass, when a failure of the points resulted in the freight train colliding head-on with the passenger train. Realising the collision was imminent, the fireman of the freight train jumped from the train but was killed by a wagon that overturned onto him. Fourteen other railway crew and passengers were injured.

In 1942, eleven wagons were smashed when an axle broke.

In 2009, the platform was extended at its northern end with scaffolding and plywood materials. Initially intended as an interim arrangement until a permanent extension was built, the temporary platform remains. Opposite the platform lies a passing loop.

Services
Eudlo is serviced by City network services to Brisbane, Nambour and Gympie North. To relieve congestion on the single track North Coast line, the rail service is supplemented by a bus service operated by Kangaroo Bus Lines on weekdays between Caboolture and Nambour as route 649.

Services by platform

References

External links

Eudlo station Queensland Rail
Eudlo station Queensland's Railways on the Internet

North Coast railway line, Queensland
Railway stations in Sunshine Coast, Queensland